Signumpriset (The Signum Award) is a trademark prize awarded to the Nordic company that best manages and foster their brand. The award was instituted in 1995 by IP law firm Groth & Co.

Previous winners

2020   Almedalsveckan
2019   Polarn O. Pyret
2018   HSB
2017   Pippi Långstrump
2016   Svenskt Tenn
2015   Lantmännen
2014   Icehotel
2013   Hästens
2012   Gröna Lund
2011   Indiska
2010   Findus
2009   Fjällräven
2008   Marimekko
2007   Löfbergs
2006   ICA AB
2005   Tetra Pak
2004   Svenska Dagbladet
2003   Absolut Vodka
2002   Atlas Copco
2001   ITT Flygt AB
2000   Carlsberg
1999   Bang & Olufsen
1998   Statoil
1997   AGA AB
1996   Ramlösa
1995   Volvo

References 

Swedish awards
Advertising agencies of Sweden